Ploog is a surname. Notable people with the surname include:
Detlev Ploog (1920–2005), German clinical psychiatrist
Dick Ploog (1936–2002), Australian cyclist
Mike Ploog (1942), American storyboard and comic book artist
Richard Ploog (1962), Australian drummer, songwriter, producer and singer

Dutch-language surnames
North German surnames
Occupational surnames